"More Than Machines" is a song by English band Bush, released as the lead single from their 2022 album The Art of Survival.

Details 
Gavin Rossdale told Loudwire that "More Than Machines" was written about what he saw to be the "destruction of women's rights" through anti-abortion laws, the "destruction of the planet" and the rise of artificial intelligence.

Chart

References

2022 singles
Environmental songs
Songs about abortion